The 2014 W-League season was the seventh season of the W-League, the Australian national women's association football competition.  The regular season started on 13 September 2014 and concluded on 7 December 2014. The Grand Final took place on 21 December 2014.

Due to Australia hosting the 2015 AFC Asian Cup, the season was scheduled to take place entirely in the 2014 calendar year instead of continuing in to 2015.

Clubs

Stadia and locations

Personnel and kits

Foreign players
 
The following do not fill a Visa position:
A Australian citizens who have chosen to represent another national team;
G Guest Players

Regular season

League table

Fixtures
Individual matches are collated at each club's season article.

Finals series

Semi-finals

Grand final

Season statistics

Top goalscorers

Own goals

Player of the Week
 Round 1 – Michelle Heyman (Canberra United)
 Round 2 – Keelin Winters (Western Sydney Wanderers)
 Round 3 – Lisa De Vanna (Melbourne Victory)
 Round 4 – Rhali Dobson (Newcastle Jets)
 Round 5 – Amy Jackson (Melbourne Victory)
 Round 6 – Katrina Gorry (Brisbane Roar)
 Round 7 – Hannah Beard (Western Sydney Wanderers)
 Round 8 – Caitlin Foord (Perth Glory)
 Round 9 – Stephanie Ochs (Canberra United)
 Round 10 – Christine Nairn (Melbourne Victory)
 Round 11 – Racheal Quigley (Melbourne Victory)
 Round 12 – Ashleigh Sykes (Canberra United)
 Semi-finals –  Kate Gill (Perth Glory)
 Grand Final – Ashleigh Sykes (Canberra United)

End-of-season awards

 Julie Dolan Medal – Emily van Egmond (Newcastle Jets)
 Players’ Player of the Year – Sam Kerr (Perth Glory)
 Young Player of the Year – Amy Harrison (Sydney FC)
 Golden Boot Award – Kate Gill (12 goals) (Perth Glory)
 Goalkeeper of the Year – Mackenzie Arnold (Perth Glory)
 Coach of the Year – Peter McGuinness (Newcastle Jets)
 Fair Play Award – Adelaide United
 Referee of the Year – Kate Jacewicz
 Goal of the Year – Ashleigh Sykes (Canberra United v Perth Glory, 7 December 2014)

International competition

The W-League was represented in the third edition of the International Women's Club Championship, known for sponsorship reasons as the Nestlé Cup.

Melbourne Victory (the winners of the 2013–14 season) participated in the tournament, which took place from 30 November until 8 December 2013, and finished in sixth place (out of 6 teams).

See also

 2014 Adelaide United W-League season
 2014 Brisbane Roar W-League season
 2014 Canberra United W-League season
 2014 Melbourne Victory W-League season
 2014 Newcastle Jets W-League season
 2014 Perth Glory W-League season
 2014 Sydney FC W-League season
 2014 Western Sydney Wanderers W-League season

References

 
Australia
1
2014–15